This is a list of cheeses from Derbyshire in the United Kingdom.

Derbyshire cheeses

See also 

 List of British cheeses
 List of cheeses
 List of English cheeses

References

Bibliography 

 Jenny Linford, Great British Cheeses, Dorling Kindersley Ltd, 2008, 

English cheeses
cheeses_of_Derbyshire